The following is a list of people executed by the U.S. state of Iowa from 1834 to 1963.

Capital punishment was abolished in Iowa in 1965. 45 people were executed in Iowa from 1834-1963, all by hanging. In 2020, a man from Iowa, Dustin Lee Honken, was federally executed at USP Terre Haute by lethal injection.

List of people executed in Iowa

State executions

Federal executions

See also
 Capital punishment in Iowa
 Capital punishment by the United States federal government
 Capital punishment in the United States

References

People executed by Iowa
People executed
Iowa